Tawi is a river that flows through the city of Jammu in the Indian union territory of Jammu and Kashmir. The Tawi is a major left bank tributary of the river Chenab. Tawi river is considered sacred and holy, as is the case with most rivers in India.

 The source of Tawi is the Kailash Kund Spring at Soej hills in Bhaderwah.
 After flowing through the Chennani and Udhampur, Tawi passes through Jammu and joins the Chenab in Ranbir Singh Pora and then enters Pakistan.
 Chennani hydro electric power project constructed on River Tawi has a capacity to generate 23 MW of power.

Origin from Kailash Kund glacier

Tawi river originates from  Kailash Kund glacier in bhaderwah Doda district , and then flows through the Seoj dhar meadows in Doda district. Its catchment is delineated by latitude 32°35'-33°5'N and longitude 74°35'-75°45'E. The catchment area of the river up to Indian border (Jammu) is 2168 km² and falls in the districts of Jammu, Udhampur and a small part of Doda.  Elevation in the catchment varies between 400 and 4000 m.

The flow of water in the river has been decreasing in recent years as the source glacier (Kailash Kund glacier) has been retreating.

Religious Importance
It is a belief of the Hindus of Jammu city that the river was brought to Jammu by 'Raja Pehar Devta' to cure his father and was given the throne of Jammu City and was declared as 'Raja', i.e. King of Jammu with the blessings of 'Shri Mata Kali Ji(Bawe wali Mata)'. Most Hindus of Jammu city at present perform 'Mundan' (tonsuring) ceremony of their children at Dev Sthan of 'Pehar Devta Ji'.

Confluence with Chenab
The height of Gujjar Nagar bridge is 90m.

After traversing Jammu city, the river crosses into Pakistan's Punjab and joins Chenab river. Tawi is a major left bank tributary of river Chenab.

Passage through Jammu city
Tawi river transverses through and divides Jammu city in two parts. The old Jammu town is located on the hill overlooking river Tawi. The new town is across the river. Tawi river is a major source of drinking water for the old city. Untreated sewage in Jammu pollutes Tawi river as it passes through the city.

Five bridges have been built over Tawi river in Jammu city: The first joint satellite town sidhra with jammu ,One join Gumat with Vikram Chowk and the other connects Gujjar Nagar with Bahu fort area, the fourth joins Bhagwati Nagar with Gandhinagar. A fifth bridge has been built near Satwari on phallian mandal road.

Artificial lake project
Jammu and Kashmir government is in the process of constructing an artificial lake on River Tawi at Bhagwati Nagar in Jammu for promotion of tourism and providing water supply to dry areas of the city. A team of Pakistani officials visited the site and studied the details of the project which will help allay any apprehensions about violation of provisions of Indus Water Treaty

See also
 Manawar Tawi River

References

Jammu Division
Jammu (city)
Rivers of Jammu and Kashmir
Indus basin
Rivers of India